José Madriz Rodríguez (21 July 1867 – 14 May 1911) was the President of Nicaragua from 21 December 1909 to 20 August 1910.

Madriz was born on 21 July 1867, in León, Nicaragua. After President José Santos Zelaya resigned on December 21, 1909 in the face of an armed Counter-Revolution and United States opposition, Madriz assumed the presidency as a designate by the congress. Madriz attempted to establish an Anti-Imperialist struggle against USA interests, but active North American intervention in favor of the Oligarchic politicians proved insurmountable, and he went into exile in August 1910. He died in Mexico City on 14 May 1911.

In 1936, the newly created Madriz Department was named in his honor.

References

External links
 José Madriz and the Conservative Restoration

Presidents of Nicaragua
People from León, Nicaragua
1867 births
1911 deaths
Liberal Party (Nicaragua) politicians